Yaroslavsky is an urban locality (an urban-type settlement) in Khorolsky District of Primorsky Krai, Russia, located  southeast of the district's administrative center of Khorol. Population:

History
It was founded in 1951 and was granted urban-type settlement status in 1957.

Economy
Yaroslavsky Ore Mining and Processing Enterprise is the backbone of the settlement's industry and economy. There is also a rural construction enterprise.

References

Urban-type settlements in Primorsky Krai
Monotowns in Russia